This article displays the qualifying draw for men's singles at the 2021 Australian Open.

For the first time in Grand Slam history, the qualifying tournament took place at Khalifa International Tennis and Squash Complex in Doha, Qatar, due to Australia's quarantine restrictions resulting from the ongoing COVID-19 pandemic. Only qualified players and players eligible for a 'Lucky loser' spot were then able to travel to Melbourne for the main draw of the 2021 Australian Open.

Seeds

Qualifiers

Lucky losers 
The lucky losers draw was made among the players who would be travelling to Australia into a 14-day quarantine period with the highest ranking losing in the qualifying competition: Hugo Dellien, Taro Daniel, Damir Džumhur, Cedrik-Marcel Stebe, Mikael Torpegaard, Robin Haase, Alexandre Müller and Borna Gojo. The LL order by order of rankings as of 4 January 2021 was Dellien, Daniel, Džumhur, Stebe, Torpegaard, Haase and Müller.

Draw

First qualifier

Second qualifier

Third qualifier

Fourth qualifier

Fifth qualifier

Sixth qualifier

Seventh qualifier

Eighth qualifier

Ninth qualifier

Tenth qualifier

Eleventh qualifier

Twelfth qualifier

Thirteenth qualifier

Fourteenth qualifier

Fifteenth qualifier

Sixteenth qualifier

References

External links 
 Qualifying draw information 
 2021 Australian Open – Men's qualifying draw and results
 2021 Australian Open – Men's draws and results at the International Tennis Federation

Men's Singles Qualifying
2021 Men's Singles
2021 in Qatari sport